Johannes Acronius Frisius (1520 – 18 October 1564) was a Dutch doctor and mathematician of the 16th century.

He was named after his city of birth, Akkrum in Friesland. From 1547 he worked as professor of mathematics in Basel, then after 1549 as professor of logic, and in 1564 of medicine. He died from the plague in the same year. Apart from mathematical and scientific works, he wrote Latin poetry and humanist tracts.

According to the Historical Dictionary of Switzerland, "nothing justifies the usual identification of A[cronius] with the philologist and botanist Johannes Atrocianus".

Publications

 De motu terrae
 De sphaera
 De astrolabio et annuli astronomici confectione
 Cronicon und Prognosticon astronomica, manuscript
 biography and 45 aphorisms of the anabaptist David Joris.

References

1520 births
1564 deaths
16th-century deaths from plague (disease)
16th-century Dutch mathematicians
Frisius
Dutch Renaissance humanists
Frisian scientists
People from Boarnsterhim
Infectious disease deaths in Switzerland